The Museum of Contemporary Art, Lima (In Spanish: Museo de Arte Contemporáneo, Lima), abbreviated as MAC Lima, is a contemporary art museum in Lima, Peru. 

The museum's building on Avenida Grau opened in 2013. The museum was designed by the Peruvian architect Frederick Cooper Llosa, and built  on land donated by the Municipality of Barranco. It is run as a private non-profit organization.

References

2013 establishments in Peru
Art museums established in 2013
Art museums and galleries in Peru
Museums in Lima
Contemporary art galleries in South America